Midhya is a 1991 Malayalam-language film. Directed by I. V. Sasi, based on the script by M. T. Vasudevan Nair, this film stars Mammootty, Suresh Gopi, Rupini, Sukumari and M. G. Soman.

Plot
Venugopal, a rich young businessman still considers Shivan as his mentor, who had helped him in his early days in Mumbai. At the time of his death, Shivan had asked Venu to take care of his younger brother Rajashekharan, which Venu obeyed wholeheartedly. Rajan was appointed as his manager and is treated more like his brother. On a visit to Rajan's house along with him, Venu meets Devi. Venu expresses Rajan's sister about his wish to marry Devi, but changes his mind after realizing that she is already engaged to Rajan. Venu wholeheartedly gets Rajan married to Devi. Rajan, in thirst to earn quick money, gets into bad company and severs ties with Venu. He becomes suspicious of his wife having an illicit relation with Venu. Slowly turning to too much drinking and gambling, Rajan falls into huge debts and to make things worse, he also becomes involved with smuggling. Venu's efforts to save Rajan from his problems and bring him back to normal life is the rest of the story.

Cast
Mammootty as Venugopal
Suresh Gopi as K. P. Rajagopal
Rupini as Devi
Jagannatha Varma as Krishna Kurup
Balan K. Nair as Narayanan
M. G. Soman as Appunni
K. P. Ummer as Nambyar
Bheeman Raghu as Varghese
Kuthiravattam Pappu as Ezhuthachan
Thikkurissy Sukumaran Nair as Muthachan
Kaviyoor Ponnamma as Rajagopal's Mother
Sukumari as Ammalu
Manimala
Sonia

References

External links

1990s Malayalam-language films
1990 films
Films with screenplays by M. T. Vasudevan Nair
Films directed by I. V. Sasi